Senator Stephens may refer to:

Members of the United States Senate
Hubert D. Stephens (1875–1946), U.S. Senator from Mississippi from 1923 until 1935
John W. Stephens (1834–1870), U.S. Senator from North Carolina from 1868 to 1870

United States state senate members
Alexander H. Stephens (1812–1883), Georgia State Senate
Allie Edward Stakes Stephens (1900–1973), Virginia State Senate
Harry Stephens (Kansas politician), Kansas State Senate
John Hall Stephens (1847–1924), Texas State Senate
Richard Stephens (pioneer) (1755–1831), Kentucky State Senate
Robert Grier Stephens Jr. (1913–2003), Georgia State Senate
Stan Stephens (1929–2021), Montana State Senate

See also
Senator Stevens (disambiguation)